Venner is an unincorporated community in Yakima County, Washington, United States, located approximately four miles southwest of Wapato.

The community developed along a line of the Northern Pacific Railway Company between Ashue and Farron.

References

Northern Pacific Railway
Unincorporated communities in Yakima County, Washington
Unincorporated communities in Washington (state)